Massimo Bertocchi (born September 27, 1985 in North York, Ontario) is a male decathlete from Canada.

Bertocchi grew up in Maple, Ontario.

Bertocchi set his personal best score (8014 points) in the men's decathlon on July 4, 2008 in Windsor.  He is a three-time national champion in the men's decathlon: 2006, 2007 and 2008.

Achievements

References

External links

1985 births
Living people
Athletes (track and field) at the 2008 Summer Olympics
Canadian decathletes
Canadian sportspeople of Italian descent
Olympic track and field athletes of Canada
Sportspeople from North York
Athletes from Toronto